Kelsey is an unincorporated community in Kelsey Township, Saint Louis County, Minnesota, United States.

The community is located seven miles west of Cotton, near the intersection of Saint Louis County Highway 7 and County Road 52 (Arkola Road).

The Whiteface River flows through the community.

History
A post office called Kelsey was established in 1897, and remained in operation until 1988. The community was named for Kelsey D. Chase, a railroad official.

References

 Rand McNally Road Atlas – 2007 edition – Minnesota entry
 Official State of Minnesota Highway Map – 2011/2012 edition

Unincorporated communities in Minnesota
Unincorporated communities in St. Louis County, Minnesota